Connecticut Roller Derby is a women's flat-track roller derby league based in Naugatuck (Greater Waterbury), Connecticut. Founded in 2006, the league reached its 10th anniversary in 2016. Connecticut Roller Derby is a member of the Women's Flat Track Derby Association (WFTDA).

History and league structure
Connecticut Roller Derby was launched as "CT RollerGirls" in March 2006, and by early 2009 was attracting up to 500 fans to games held at venues such as the Connecticut Sports Center.

Connecticut Roller Derby has travel teams and home teams. The home teams play each other, and are the Bone Crushers, the Iron Angels, and the Widowmakers, whereas the two travel teams, The CT All-Stars and The Yankee Brutals, play teams from other leagues, with the All-Stars representing the league at the WFTDA level.

WFTDA competition
CT RollerGirls became a member of the Women's Flat Track Derby Association in early 2007, announced by the WFTDA in May of that year. In 2009, the CT All-Stars qualified for the WFTDA Playoffs for the first time. Entering the WFTDA Eastern Regional Tournament as the eighth seed, the All-Stars opened their tournament with losses to DC Rollergirls and Providence Roller Derby, before defeating Dominion Derby Girls 156-57 to finish the weekend in ninth place.

Rankings

NR = no end-of-year ranking supplied

Scholarship program
As part of Connecticut Roller Derby's community outreach mandate, the league sponsors a scholarship each year, the Cindy Luberto Scholarship for Women Athletes, which is a $500.00 grant towards post-secondary education.

References

External links
Official Website

Roller derby leagues in Connecticut
Naugatuck, Connecticut
Roller derby leagues established in 2006
2006 establishments in Connecticut
Women's sports in Connecticut